Ponatshego Honorius Kefaeng Kedikilwe (born 7 July 1938) is a Motswana politician who was Vice-President of Botswana from 2012 to 2014. A member of the ruling Botswana Democratic Party (BDP), he has also served as Minister of Minerals, Energy, and Water Resources since 2007.

Political career
Kedikilwe was educated at the Kikuyu College of Social Studies, the University of East Africa, Nairobi 1963–64; University of Rochester, NY 1964–65; University of Connecticut 1965–68; Maxwell School of Citizenship and Public Affairs, Syracuse University.

He was first elected to the National Assembly as the Member of Parliament for Mmadinare in 1984. He served as Minister of Finance from 1998 to 1999.

Kedikilwe served as Chairman of the BDP until 2003. President Ian Khama was elected as Botswana Democratic Party Chairman at a party congress on 22 July 2003, defeating Kedikilwe; Khama received 512 votes against 219 for Kedikilwe. Khama had been backed for the post by Former President Festus Mogae, and the outcome was viewed as crucial, paving the way for Khama to eventually succeed Mogae as President during that time

Kedikilwe was appointed as Minister of Minerals, Energy, and Water Resources in January 2007.

Vice-President Mompati Merafhe retired on 31 July 2012. President Ian Khama nominated Kedikilwe as Vice-President on 1 August 2012, and the National Assembly promptly approved the nomination; 38 MPs voted in favor, while 12 abstained from the vote. Kedikilwe was sworn in later in the same day. The government said that Kedikilwe would retain his portfolio as Minister of Minerals, Energy, and Water Resources.

Following the 2014 general election, Khama instead nominated Mokgweetsi Masisi as Vice-President on 12 November 2014.

References

External links

1938 births
Living people
Botswana Democratic Party politicians
Vice-presidents of Botswana
Finance ministers of Botswana
Energy ministers of Botswana
Water ministers of Botswana
Members of the National Assembly (Botswana)
Maxwell School of Citizenship and Public Affairs alumni